Azhe (Chinese: 阿哲; Azhepo;) is one of the Loloish languages spoken by the Yi people of China.

Dialects
Wang Chengyou (王成有) (2003:210) lists 3 dialects of Azhe, which are all mutually intelligible.

Wushan 五山土语 (in Mile County 弥勒县)
Xunjian 巡检, Mile County 弥勒县
Hongxi 虹溪, Mile County 弥勒县
Panxi 盘溪, Huaning County 华宁县
Jiangbian 江边土语 (in Mile County 弥勒县)
Qujiang 曲江土语 (in Jianshui County 建水县)

Azhe is spoken in Mile, Huaning, Kaiyuan, and Jianshui counties, with about 100,000 speakers.

References

Loloish languages
Languages of China